The following is a list of the municipalities (comuni) of Lombardy, Italy.

There are 1,507 municipalities in Lombardy (as of January 2019):

243 in the Province of Bergamo
205 in the Province of Brescia
148 in the Province of Como
112 in the Province of Cremona
85 in the Province of Lecco
60 in the Province of Lodi
64 in the Province of Mantua
133 in the Metropolitan City of Milan
55 in the Province of Monza and Brianza
186 in the Province of Pavia
77 in the Province of Sondrio
138 in the Province of Varese

List

See also
List of municipalities of Italy

References

 
Lombardy